Magnolia is an offshore oil drilling and production Extended Tension Leg Platform in the Gulf of Mexico.

The hull consists of four circular columns connected at the bottom by rectangular pontoons. At the base of each column, a pontoon extends outward to support two tethers, which are connected to pile foundations on the seabed.

It is located along the southern edge of the Titan Mini-Basin where multiple deep-water reservoir sands encounter a series of down-to-the-basin and antithetic faults adjacent to salt.

See also 
Mars (oil platform)
Gulf of Mexico
Tension-leg platform
Offshore oil and gas in the US Gulf of Mexico
Oil platform

References

Oil platforms off the United States
Petroleum industry in the Gulf of Mexico
Energy infrastructure in Louisiana